S. B. Satheesan is a national award-winning Indian costume designer or fashion designer working predominantly in Malayalam films.

Early career
Satheeshan grew up in Chemboor, near Venjaramoodu, Kerala. He trained with a neighbourhood tailor and started a tailoring shop named 'S.B. Stichings' at Chemboor. He was discovered by Mayalam film producer Adoor Gopalakrishnan who saw his costume designs in a local theatrical production and hired him to work on Kathapurushan.

Filmography

Awards
Kerala State Film Award
 1997 Kerala State Film Award for Best Costume Designer - Guru
 1998 Kerala State Film Award for Best Costume Designer - Daya
 1999 Kerala State Film Award for Best Costume Designer- Rishivamsam
 2000 Kerala State Award for Best Costume Designer- Devadoothan
 2002 Kerala State Award for Best Costume Designer-Nizhalkuthu
 2005 Kerala State Award for Best Costume Designer-Athbutha dweep 
 2007 Kerala State Film Award for Best Costume Designer - Naalu Pennungal
 2010 Kerala State Film Award for Best Costume designer- Yugapushan,Makaramanju
 2012 Kerala State Film Award for Best Costume Designer - Celluloid, ozhimuri
 
National Film Award
 1998 National Film Award for Best Costume Design - Daya

References

External links 
Moviebuff: S.B. Satheeshan

Indian male fashion designers
Costume designers of Malayalam cinema
Kerala State Film Award winners
Film people from Kerala
People from Thiruvananthapuram district
20th-century Indian designers
21st-century Indian designers
Living people
Year of birth missing (living people)